| player              = 
| prevseason          = Clausura 2017
| nextseason          = Clausura 2018
}}

The Apertura 2017 Copa MX (officially the Apertura 2017 Copa Corona MX for sponsorship reasons) was the 78th staging of the Copa MX, the 50th staging in the professional era and is the eleventh tournament played since the 1996–97 edition.

This tournament began on 25 July 2017 and was originally scheduled to end on 1 November 2017. Due to the 2017 Puebla earthquake, the tournament was postponed in the Round of 16 phase, pushing the end of the tournament to 21 December 2017.

The final was held at Estadio BBVA Bancomer in the Monterrey suburb of Guadalupe with the home team Monterrey defeating Pachuca 1–0 to win their second title.

As winners, Monterrey earned a spot to face the winners of the Clausura 2018  edition, in the 2018 Supercopa MX.

Participants
The tournament will feature all Liga MX clubs (excluding recently promoted Lobos BUAP) as well as ten Ascenso MX clubs.

Due to the new format of the CONCACAF Champions League, Mexican clubs do not begin their participation until February, thus the teams qualified to 2017–18 CONCACAF Champions League (América, Guadalajara, Tijuana, UANL) will participate in this season's Copa MX.

Draw
The draw for the tournament took place on June 6, 2017 in Cancún, Quintana Roo, Mexico. 27 teams were drawn into nine groups of three, with each group containing one team from each of the three pots.

Clubs in Pot 1 were drawn to be the seed of each group according to the order of their drawing. That is, the first club that was drawn is seed of Group 1, the second drawn is seed of Group 2 and so on and so on. The Liga MX teams in Pot 1 are the teams who ended 1–5 in the 2016–17 Liga MX Aggregate table The Ascenso MX teams in Pot 1 are the four best possible teams in the 2016–17 Ascenso MX Aggregate table. Zacatepec Siglo XXI who ended fourth, were replaced by Oaxaca, who ended fifth, due to the club's disappearance.

Pot 2 contained Liga MX clubs who ended 6–9 in the Aggregate table and Ascenso MX clubs who ended 6–10 in the Aggregate table. Coras, who ended tenth in the Aggregate table, moved to Zacatepec, Morelos and became the new Zacatepec franchise.

Pot 3 contained Liga MX clubs who ended 10–17 in the Aggregate table. UDG, who ended twelfth in the Ascenso MX Aggregate table, replaced recently promoted Lobos BUAP.

Teams

Tiebreakers
If two or more clubs are equal on points on completion of the group matches, the following criteria are applied to determine the rankings:

 superior goal difference;
 higher number of goals scored;
 scores of the group matches played among the clubs in question;
 higher number of goals scored away in the group matches played among the clubs in question;
 fair play ranking;
 drawing of lots.

Group stage
Every group is composed of three clubs, each group has at least one club from Liga MX and Ascenso MX

Group 1

Group 2

Group 3

Group 4

Group 5

Group 6

Group 7

Group 8

Group 9

Ranking of second-placed teams

Knockout stage
The clubs that advance to this stage will be ranked and seeded 1 to 16 based on performance in the group stage. In case of ties, the same tiebreakers used to rank the runners-up will be used.
All rounds are played in a single game. If a game ends in a draw, it will proceed directly to a penalty shoot-out. The highest seeded club will host each match, regardless of which division each club belongs. 
The winners of the groups and the seven best second place teams of each group will advance to the Knockout stage.

Qualified teams
The nine group winners and the seven best runners-up from the group stage qualify for the final stage.

Seeding

Bracket

Round of 16

All Round of 16 matches, which were originally scheduled to be played between 19–21 September, were postponed due to the 2017 Puebla earthquake.

Quarterfinals

Semifinals

Final

Top goalscorers
Players sorted first by goals scored, then by last name.

Source: Copa MX

Notes

References

External links
Official site

2017, 2
Copa Mx, 2
Copa Mx, 2